The 1926 International cricket season was from April 1926 to August 1926.

Season overview

June

Test trial in England

Australia in England

Wales in Ireland

July

Ireland in Scotland

Foresters in Netherlands

August

Netherlands in Belgium

References

1926 in cricket